Aziz Suryal Atiya (July 5, 1898 – September 24, 1988) was an Egyptian Coptologist who was a Coptic historian and scholar and an expert in Islamic and Crusades studies.

Atiya was the founder of the Institute of Coptic Studies in Cairo in 1950s, and was also the founder of the  Middle East Center, University of Utah.

His library, The Aziz Atiya Library for Middle East Studies at University of Utah, is considered the fifth largest such collection in North America and is recognized internationally as a major research library in this field.

While at the University of Utah, Professor Atiya rediscovered ten lost papyri fragments related to the Mormon scripture, Book of Abraham, in the archives of the New York Metropolitan Museum of Art.

Work
Atiya published a large study entitled The Crusades in the Later Middle Ages in 1938, and was also the first author of The Coptic Encyclopedia, published in 1991.

The chapters on the Copts in his book The History of Eastern Christianity (1968, 1980) have become landmarks, not only for specialists but also for the general public.

It was Atiya who, after many lively debates with the publishers and their readers, had the words 'Coptology' and 'Coptologist' introduced into the English language.

He could speak English, Arabic, French, German, Italian, Latin, and to a lesser extent, Spanish, Greek, Coptic, Turkish, Welsh, and Dutch.

Academic career
Honorary Professor of Medieval (including Oriental) History for Kahle's Orientalisches Seminar in Bonn, Germany 1935-1939
Professor of Medieval History at Cairo University 1939–1942.
Vice-Dean of the Faculty of Arts (1949–1950) and  Chairman of the History Department at Alexandria University 1952–1954.
Medieval Academy Visiting Professor of Arabic Studies at University of Michigan.
Positions at the Union Theological Seminary and Columbia University.
Patten Visiting Professor and Lecturer at Indiana University1957
Professor of Arabic and Islamic History at Princeton University  (1957–1958).
Professor of Languages and History at  University of Utah 1959.

Awards
Earned a B.A. with first-class honors in Medieval and Modern History University of Liverpool in England 1931.
Ph.D. in Arabic and Islamic Studies University of London 1933.
Awarded a D.Litt.(Doctor of Letters) University of Liverpool 1938.
Granted the honorary degree of Doctor of Humane Letters and honorary Doctor of Laws (LL.D.), Brigham Young University United States 1967.

Publications
The Arabic Manuscripts of Mount Sinai: A Hand-list of the Arabic Manuscripts and Scrolls Microfilmed at the Library of the Monastery of St. Catherine (1955). ASIN B0006AU4NM.
The Coptic Encyclopedia, vol. 1 (1991).
The Copts and Christian Civilization (1979). .
Crusade, Commerce and Culture (1962). ISBN ASIN B0000CLOTM.
The Crusade (1977). .
The Crusade: Historiography and Bibliography (1962). ASIN B0000CLOU1.
The Crusade in the Later Middle Ages (1938).
The Crusade of Nicopolis (1934).
The Crusade (1962). .
Egypt and Aragon: Embassies and Diplomatic Correspondence Between 1300 and 1330 A.D. (1966). ASIN B0007J1LYI.
A Fourteenth Century Encyclopedist from Alexandria (1977). ASIN B0006XYA4I. About Muḥammad ibn al-Ḳāsim al-Nuwayrī al-Iskandarānī, whose three-volume history of Alexandria Atiya edited and published in six volumes.
A History of Eastern Christianity (1980). . This is an expanded edition of the first edition published in 1968. ASIN B000IOZ7AG.
The Monastery of St Catherine and the Mount Sinai Expedition (1952). ASIN B0007EBOK4.
Atiya published approximately twenty books, many of which are multi-volume projects also journal articles, book chapters, and encyclopedia articles, including authoring or co-authoring dozens in the monumental Coptic Encyclopedia.

See also
Coptic history
Coptic Orthodox Church of Alexandria
List of Copts
Lists of Egyptians
Institute of Coptic Studies
Coptology

References

External links
Biography
Claremont Coptic Encyclopedia, updated and maintained by the School of Religion at Claremont Graduate University
Articles authored/co-authored by Atiya as listed in the Claremont Coptic Encyclopedia
Books titles by Aziz Suryal Atiya
 Arabic Papyrus, Parchment, and Paper at University of Utah Digital Library, Marriott Library Special Collections
 Aziz Suryal Atiya Papers at University of Utah Digital Library, Marriott Library Special Collections

1898 births
1988 deaths
Egyptian people of Coptic descent
Coptic history
Historians of the Crusades
University of Utah faculty
Coptologists
Academic staff of Cairo University
University of Michigan faculty
Book of Abraham